The 1956 Maryland Terrapins football team represented the University of Maryland in the 1956 NCAA University Division football season as a member of the Atlantic Coast Conference. They were led by first-year head coach Tommy Mont, who had been promoted from backfield assistant after Jim Tatum left to take over at North Carolina. Preseason hopes were high for the team, but it suffered numerous injuries and other misfortunes. Maryland finished with a 2–7–1 record, and the Associated Press called it "one of the year's most disappointing football teams".

Schedule

Before the season
Maryland head coach Jim Tatum resigned on January 8, 1956, to take the same post at his alma mater, North Carolina, and he was replaced by backfield coach Tommy Mont. Mont was a former quarterback for Maryland and the Washington Redskins. Mont came with the personal recommendation of Tatum. Tatum also instructed his former players to stay at Maryland rather than follow him by transferring to North Carolina.

As head coach, Mont was unable to recruit the highly skilled athletes that Tatum had consistently secured during his tenure. Rod Breedlove, who played on freshman team in 1956 and started on the varsity squad thereafter, was an exception as one of the best guard prospects in the nation. Due to the pressures associated with coaching a major college program, Mont eventually resigned as head coach after the 1958 season in order to take the same position at DePauw University.

Personnel
The 1956 team consisted of the following letterwinners:

Gene Alderton
Ronald Athey
Al Beardsley
Bill Burgly
Fred Cole
Nick DeCicco
John Fritsch
Fred Hamilton
Jim Hatter
Don Healy
Ed Heuring
Ted Kershner
Charles Kichman
George Kolarac
Bill Kolmo
Bob Layman
Dickie Lewis
Wilbur Main
Bob Rusevlyan
Mike Sandusky
Ben Scotti
Tom Selep
Jim Skarda
Tom Stefl
Bob Suchy
Paul Tonetti
Bill Turner
Jean Waters
Al Wharton

The coaching staff consisted of:

Tommy Mont, head coach
Ed Fullerton
William Dovell
Johnny Idzik, line coach
Fred Layman
Roy Lester, ends coach
Joe Moss
Jim Peebles
Bob Ward

Season
Maryland entered 1956 ranked number-six in the Associated Press preseason poll. The previous year, the freshman Terrapins finished with an undefeated record, and Sports Illustrated had called it the "best freshman team in the entire South." Before resigning his post as head coach, Jim Tatum had said before the 1956 Orange Bowl, "Our 1956 squad will have the greatest potential of all, despite the loss of ten seniors."

The roster, however, was depleted by injuries and the team beset by bad luck in general. The 1957 edition of The Terrapin yearbook wrote the most serious blow to the team's prospects occurred when would-be starting quarterback Frank Tamburello was drafted into the Army. Maryland lost another returner when back Phil Perlo did not re-enroll at the school. In another twist of fate, the entire team had to be inoculated against jaundice after starting halfback Howie Dare and a reserve center were diagnosed with the malady. Dare would miss the entire season.

In the season opener, Syracuse soundly defeated Maryland, 26–12, which in part, "rudely jolted" the preseason prognostications of many college football experts. After the Terrapins edged Wake Forest, 6–0, 16th-ranked Baylor handed Maryland its first shutout, 14–0, in 70 games. The following week at the Orange Bowl, 13th-ranked Miami resorted to the air to beat Maryland, 13–6. After the loss, the Associated Press called the Terrapins squad "one of the year's most disappointing football teams."

Led by former Terrapins' coach Jim Tatum, North Carolina decisively beat Maryland, 34–6, in one of its two wins of the season. Both Carolina victories, however, were later vacated due to use of an ineligible player, although Maryland records still credit the Tar Heels with the win.

A week later, Johnny Majors led third-ranked Tennessee to beat Maryland, 34–7, and completed three touchdown passes while "hitting his receivers with the accuracy of a mountaineer rifleman." After a loss to Kentucky, Maryland tied 11th-ranked Clemson, which had hoped to secure its invitation to the Orange Bowl as the ACC representative.

Maryland lost at South Carolina, 13–0, and then traveled to Raleigh to face North Carolina State. Maryland trailed in the second half, but a 103-yard interception return from the Terrapins' end zone by back Dickie Lewis sparked a comeback. Maryland won, 25–14, to finish the season with a 2–7–1 mark.

After the season, The Baltimore Sun described Mont and quarterback John Fritsch as "two of the biggest fall guys in college football this year" for events beyond their control.

References

Maryland
Maryland Terrapins football seasons
Maryland Terrapins football